Lablabi or Lablebi is a Tunisian dish based on chick peas in a thin garlic and cumin-flavoured broth, served over small pieces of stale crusty bread. 

The name comes from the Turkish word leblebi, meaning grilled chick-peas.

It is commonly eaten in inexpensive restaurants. Raw or soft-cooked egg is nearly always added to the hot soup mix (thus cooking), along with olive oil, harissa, additional cumin, capers, tuna, Baklouti pepper and sometimes olives, garlic and vinegar or lemon or lime juice. Further garnishes may include cilantro (coriander), parsley and scallions.  A traditional, but rarer, version, hergma, is made with cow's trotters.

In the Northern part of the country, the so-called Bizerte lablebi is a sandwich consisting of the same ingredients in a white bread baguette. Lablabi was originally a breakfast dish eaten in winter, but it is now eaten at any time of the day and year round. Some places sell it in late summer nights and it's especially popular among young people hoping to avoid a hangover after a night out.

See also
 List of Middle Eastern dishes
 Leblebi
 List of African dishes
 List of legume dishes
 Berber cuisine

References

External links
 Lablabi - Tunisian Chickpea Soup

Arab cuisine
Tunisian cuisine
Iraqi cuisine
Turkish soups
Legume dishes
Chickpea dishes
Vegetable dishes of Tunisia
Middle Eastern cuisine